Bjarne Gotfred Eriksen (31 July 1886 – 13 November 1976) was a Norwegian businessperson and fencer.

He was born in Trondheim. He competed in the individual foil and épée events at the 1912 Summer Olympics.  His brother Einar competed at the same Olympics in rowing.

He was hired as a Supreme Court barrister in 1917, but started a career in Norsk Hydro in 1926. He was originally head of the judicial and financial department, but was then promoted to Director-General (CEO) in 1941.

After the German occupation of Norway, the Germans wanted to further increase output of heavy water; the situation escalated, until Hydro's top management protested, and in early 1943, Bjarne Eriksen, the company's managing director, was arrested and sent to a concentration camp in Germany.

After the War, Erikson returned to his position, where he remained until 1956; after this he was chairman of the board from 1957 to 1960.

References

1886 births
1976 deaths
20th-century Norwegian lawyers
20th-century Norwegian businesspeople
Norsk Hydro people
Norwegian male foil fencers
Olympic fencers of Norway
Fencers at the 1912 Summer Olympics
People from Trondheim
Norwegian male épée fencers